Vasily Alexandrovich Smirnov (born December 31, 1904 O.S./January 13, 1905 N.S. in the village of Sinitsyno; died 1979) was a Soviet writer.

Having published his first work in 1924, Smirnov became a member of the CPSU in 1925.  In 1960–1965, he was the editor-in-chief of the Druzhba Narodov magazine.

1905 births
1979 deaths
People from Myshkinsky District
Soviet writers
Communist Party of the Soviet Union members
Soviet magazine editors